Moore Creek is a short creek in the St. Lawrence River drainage basin in Temiskaming Shores, Timiskaming District, Ontario, Canada, between the communities of New Liskeard and Haileybury.

Hydrology
The Ontario Northland Railway mainline and Highway 11B cross the creek just before the mouth.

See also
List of rivers of Ontario

References

Rivers of Timiskaming District
Temiskaming Shores